Sergei Aleksandrovich Sukharev (born 29 January 1987) is a Russian former professional football player. He played as a centre-back.

Club career
He made his Russian Premier League debut for FC Arsenal Tula on 22 August 2014 in a game against FC Terek Grozny.

He played as FC Tosno won the 2017–18 Russian Cup final against FC Avangard Kursk on 9 May 2018 in the Volgograd Arena.

Honours

Club
Tosno
 Russian Cup: 2017–18

Career statistics

References

External links
 Player page by sportbox.ru  
 
 
 

1987 births
People from Stary Oskol
Living people
Russian footballers
Association football defenders
Russian expatriate footballers
Expatriate footballers in Belarus
Russian Premier League players
FC Torpedo Moscow players
FC Arsenal Tula players
FC Belshina Bobruisk players
FC Tosno players
FC Mordovia Saransk players
Belarusian Premier League players
Sportspeople from Belgorod Oblast